Kankakee station is an Amtrak intercity train station in Kankakee, Illinois, United States. The station is a regular stop for the Illini and Saluki, and is a flag stop for the City of New Orleans, served only when passengers have tickets to and from the station.

History 
The Illinois Central Railroad Company was founded in 1851. The first train pulled into the station on July 11, 1853. The rail connection reduced the travel time between the two cities from six days by wagon to three hours by rail. It also provided Kankakee with access to industrial resources in the north–south direction; the city was no longer dependent on the east–west Kankakee River. Kankakee was incorporated two years later.

The original station was a small, wood-framed station. However, by the 1890s, it had fallen into disrepair and no longer conformed to city ordinances. The Illinois Central agreed to commission a new train station in 1897, which was completed the next year. The first train arrived at the new station at 7:30 a.m. on January 10, 1898. Frank Lloyd Wright traveled through the station on several occasions while designing two houses in Kankakee, remarking of the new building, "not a style of my choosing but good enough for the community." The city was also served by the New York Central Railroad at another station, with trains such as the James Whitcomb Riley, bound for Cincinnati.

Telephones were installed in 1902, replacing the original telegraph wires. These lines were moved underground in 1911. Rail use declined in the 1930s, coinciding with the Great Depression and the increased use of automobiles. Furthermore, the Kankakee Electric Railway Company, which provided interurban service to the station, went out of business in 1933. The station saw a resurgence in the 1940s during World War II, when personnel training at Chanute Field in Rantoul would come to Kankakee on leisure time. The station has remained in continuous use since 1898.

Historical services 
Historically, the station served trains on the Illinois Central's routes going southwest, south and southeast. The last of these, aside from the City of New Orleans, Illini and Saluki was the South Wind.

to St. Louis:
Green Diamond
to New Orleans:
City of New Orleans
Panama Limited
to Florida:
Seminole
South Wind

Disposition today 
The station  has been on the National Register of Historic Places since the year 2000. By the late 1980s, the depot had fallen into disrepair. The city purchased the building from the Illinois Central in 1990 and finished a full restoration eight years later. The $1 million project was funded with $750,000 in city funds and private donations. Today, the northern end of the station is home of the Kankakee Railroad Museum.

In popular culture 
In Steve Goodman's song "City of New Orleans" (popularized by Arlo Guthrie) the train departs the Kankakee station.

Bus Connections 
River Valley Metro: – Routes 1, 7, & 8

References

External links 

Kankakee Amtrak Station (USA Rail Guide -- Train Web)

Amtrak stations in Illinois
Transportation in Kankakee County, Illinois
Kankakee, Illinois
Railway stations on the National Register of Historic Places in Illinois
Railway stations in the United States opened in 1898
Former Illinois Central Railroad stations
National Register of Historic Places in Kankakee County, Illinois